The Flock is a survival horror video game developed by Vogelsap. It was released for Microsoft Windows on August 21, 2015. The game is multiplayer-only with a finite lifespan for all players. Poor financial performance of the game resulted in the servers being shut down without player deaths reaching the set limit.

Gameplay
The Flock is an asymmetrical multiplayer video game that is played from a first-person perspective.

The player defeats enemies with light. Enemies have the ability to turn into statues and become invincible. Certain artifacts will give players special abilities, such as the ability to run faster, jump higher, and remain undetected. The game contains a mixture of action and stealth. The player's flashlight can give away their position to enemies. When players lose their lives in the game, the population of the game decreases. When all players die, the game's online portion is no longer functional and, according to the game's developer, the game will "never be purchasable again."

Plot

The game starts with the player controlling a creature in a flock. They can find an artifact which will turn them into a human, although other monsters will try to steal the artifact.

Development

The game was developed by the Dutch studio Vogelsap. It was first announced on May 30, 2013. The first trailer was unveiled on April 18, 2014.

Reception

Based on five reviews, Metacritic gave The Flock an aggregated review score of 36 out of 100, indicating "generally unfavorable reviews".

References

External links
 

2015 video games
Asymmetrical multiplayer video games
Indie video games
Science fiction video games
Video games developed in the Netherlands
Games financed by Indie Fund
Windows games
Windows-only games
Horror video games